Leland is an unincorporated community in southern Utah County, Utah, United States. Formerly a separate settlement, it has been largely absorbed into the city of Spanish Fork, with most of the rest being included in boundaries of Benjamin (a census-designated place).

References

Former populated places in Utah County, Utah
Spanish Fork, Utah